Patrick Wittich (born July 3, 1982 in Kaiserslautern) is a German footballer. As of February 2009, he plays for an amateur team TuS Altleiningen. He spent two seasons in the Bundesliga for 1. FC Kaiserslautern.

References

1982 births
Living people
German footballers
1. FC Kaiserslautern players
1. FC Kaiserslautern II players
SV Wehen Wiesbaden players
Bundesliga players

Association football midfielders